Àlex Simon i Casanovas (born 1960 in Gràcia neighbourhood of Barcelona) is a Catalonian mountain guide, climbing teacher, outdoor instructor and logistic. He has climbed in the Pyrenees, Alps and the Dolomites, as well as in the United States, Brazil, Guatemala, Indonesia, Australia and Antarctica, and crossed by bicycle sections of the Simpson Desert (Australia) and Atacama Desert (Chile).

Sport events organisation
Since 2012, Simon I Casanovas has organized the Rovaniemi 150 Arctic Winter Race. Rovaniemi150 is the first, and still the only one (2017) polar winter ultramarathon in Europe which combines three categories: fatbike, ski and run.

Since 2014, he also organize the Lapland Extreme Challenge in Finnish Lapland in winter.

Since 2015, Rovaniemi150 have two more different challenges: Rovaniemi66 and Rovaniemi300.

Work in Antarctica
Simon I Casanovas was the mountain guides team leader at the Spanish Antarctic base of Juan Carlos I in 2001–06, carrying out extensive field work on Hurd Peninsula, Huron Glacier area, Byers Peninsula, and Ioannes Paulus II Peninsula on Livingston Island in the South Shetland Islands.

Climbs
First ascent of Mount Bowles, Livingston Island on 5 January 2003.
First ascent of Burdick East Peak, Livingston Island on 20 November 2003.

Honour
Casanovas Peak on Livingston Island in the South Shetland Islands, Antarctica is named for Àlex Simon i Casanovas.

Personal life
Since 2007, he lives in Finland.

Publications
 Article "Bajo el sol del desierto". Solo Bici nº7. Dec. 1991.
 Article "La motoneige et moi-une expérience en Antarctique". Motoneige Quebec. Dec 2009.
 Article "Sueños gélidos, sacos para frio extremo". Desnivel. Dec 2002.
 Àlex S. Casanovas.  [The Snowmobile Bible: Progressive safety over dangerous terrain]. Lulu Inc., 2008. 112 pp.

References

1960 births
Living people
Explorers of Antarctica
People from Barcelona
Spanish explorers
Spanish mountain climbers
20th-century explorers
21st-century explorers
Spain and the Antarctic